The 1986 Dartmouth Big Green football team was an American football team that represented Dartmouth College during the 1986 NCAA Division I-AA football season. The Big Green finished fourth in the Ivy League.

In its ninth and final season under head coach  Joe Yukica, the team compiled a 3–6–1 record and was outscored 272 to 188. David Gabianelli and Russell Gardner were the team captains.

The Big Green's 3–3–1 conference record placed fourth in the Ivy League standings. Dartmouth outscored Ivy opponents 169 to 113. 

Dartmouth played its home games at Memorial Field on the college campus in Hanover, New Hampshire.

Schedule

References

Dartmouth
Dartmouth Big Green football seasons
Dartmouth Big Green football